The Shropshire Women's cricket team is the women's representative cricket team for the English historic county of Shropshire. They play their home games at various grounds across the county, including Ellesmere College Ground, Ellesmere and are captained by Lara Jones. Shropshire withdrew from the Women's County Championship after the 2018 season, have since competed in the Women's Twenty20 Cup. They are partnered with the West Midlands regional side Central Sparks.

History
Shropshire Women joined the Women's County Championship in 2008, finishing bottom of Division 5 Midlands in their first season. Shropshire went on to consistently play in the bottom tiers of the Championship, but did win Division 4 South & West in 2016. Shropshire bowlers Bethan Ellis and Zoe Griffiths were the joint-second highest wicket-takers in the division. Shropshire did not compete in the final season of the Women's County Championship, 2019.

Shropshire have also competed in the Women's Twenty20 Cup, from 2009 to 2010 and from 2014 onwards. Their most successful season was in 2015, when they topped Division 4C and then gained promotion to Division 3 in a play-off group, winning a crucial game against Leicestershire by just three runs. Shropshire played in Division Three of the competition until the format changed after the 2019 season. In 2021, they competed in the East Midlands Group of the Twenty20 Cup, finishing 3rd with 2 victories. They finished bottom of their group in the 2022 Women's Twenty20 Cup.

Players

Current squad

Based on appearances in the 2022 season.

Seasons

Women's County Championship

Women's Twenty20 Cup

See also
 Shropshire County Cricket Club
 Central Sparks

References

Cricket in Shropshire
Women's cricket teams in England